Seneghe is a comune (municipality) in the Province of Oristano in the Italian region Sardinia, located about  northwest of Cagliari and about  north of Oristano.

Seneghe borders the following municipalities: Bonarcado, Cuglieri, Milis, Narbolia, Santu Lussurgiu.

Demographic evolution

References

Cities and towns in Sardinia